Platon Alekseevich Lechitsky (18 March 1856 – 2 February 1921) was a Russian general.

Biography
Born in the Grodno province in the family of a rural priest Alexei Nikolaevich and Sofia Alexandrovna (née Pavlovskaya) Lechitsky. His father graduated from the Lithuanian Theological Seminary in the first category in 1849, was ordained priest on September 14, 1851, and served in the diocese of Grodno. Plato Lechitsky entered the seminary in the footsteps of his father, but already in 1873 he was dismissed from grade 1 as he failed to appear for the whole academic year. On March 25, 1877, the young man entered the military service as a private on the rights of self-determining 3rd rank in the 7th grenadier Samogit adjutant general Count Totleben regiment, stationed in Moscow. And already on August 7 of that year he was sent to study at the Warsaw Infantry Junker School. The future commander graduated from the 2nd category in 1879 and received the rank of praporshchik. October 22, 1879, he began serving in the 39th infantry reserve personnel battalion, stationed in Brest-Litovsk. August 26, 1880, was promoted to ensign. February 12, 1881 - as second lieutenants, November 8, 1887 - to headquarters captains and December 11, 1889 - to captains. On this rank, February 18, 1891, Lechitsky was transferred to the 6th East Siberian Line Battalion, and June 22, 1892 - to the 5th East Siberian Rifle Battalion. From October 24, 1893, to August 28, 1894, he studied at the Officer Rifle School, which he graduated "successfully." February 26, 1896, promoted to lieutenant colonel. November 24, 1898, with his battalion, transformed and renamed the 4th East Siberian Rifle Regiment, was sent as part of a detachment to occupy the Port Arthur fortress.

Chinese camping
In 1900, at the opening of hostilities against the Chinese (during the Boxer Rebellion), the 4th East Siberian Rifle Regiment was appointed to the North Manchurian detachment of General Vladimir Viktorovich Sakharov. Lechitsky, with 2 companies, carried out a reconnaissance on July 27 for the city of Boyans, occupied by boxers. From August 4 to 6, in the Sakharov detachment, Lechitsky participated in the battle near the city of Azhihe. Then commanding a separate detachment of 2 companies and 1 hundred security guards of the Chinese Eastern Railway, Lechitsky survived on October 3 a successful battle with boxers near the village of Fonigou, near the city of Kuanchenzi. When, at the beginning of 1901, an expedition was organized from the troops of the southern Manchurian detachment to eastern Mongolia, to the city of Kulo, Lechitsky commanded a convoy aimed at providing an important railway station Node in Kabanzi.

Produced for fights. difference in colonels, Lechitsky was appointed temporarily commander of the 1st Siberian Rifle Regiment E.V. and military commander of Mukden. On September 2, 1902, Lechitsky was appointed commander of the 7th Caucasian Rifle Battalion, but, without accepting it, on November 3 received the 24th East Siberian Rifle Regiment.

Russo-Japanese war

With a regiment in September 1904, he marched from Liaoyang to Fynhuangcheng and on to Yala. On April 11, Lechitsky was entrusted with protecting a section of the Yalu River from the village of Syndyagou to s. Kuluza, over 18 miles, with a detachment from the battalion of the 24th East Siberian Rifle Regiment, a company of the 10th East Siberian Rifle Regiment, the 1st East Siberian Mountain Battery and 2 hundred. Ussuri Cossack Regiment. Having made a forced transition of 44 miles, Lechitsky at dawn on April 12 arrived at the mouth of the river. Ambihe and took his assigned unit detachment, mainly against the mouth of the river. Ambihe is an important crossing point. Apr 18 Tyurenchensky battle broke out. Absolutely not oriented from the headquarters of the Eastern detachment, Lechitsky only received information about him from the Chinese on the 19th and therefore left on the 20th, and on the 21st joined the right column of the Eastern detachment, retreating to Modulinsky Pass. On May 1, all parts of the Eastern detachment retreated to Lyandansyan, leaving the advanced units at the passes, including on Modulinsky — the Lechitsky detachment from the 24th V.-Sib. page pp. with 2 op. and 1 hundred. kaz. June 14, by order of the head of Vost. detachment of the 24th V.-Sib. p. n. moved to Thavuan, forming a general reserve. Having no reliable information about the enemy, the head of the Eastern detachment, Count Keller, appointed an intensified reconnaissance on the night of June 21, during which Lechitsky, with a detachment of 2 battalions, had to find out the forces of the protest on the right. crest of Ufanguansk. the pass. All intelligence has been reduced to a number of departments. bayonets. fights with outposts Japan. the watchman. protection. Having determined that the first ridge is Ufanguansk. The pass is occupied by a whole regiment, but without artillery, L. began to depart at 5.30 a.m. It was already light, and therefore, with the detachment to Lidapuz and further along the high road, detachment L. carried the chapters. Losses - 12 of. and 355 lower rank .; L. himself was shell-shocked rouge. right bullet right. temple. On July 4, L. took part in the establishment of a part of the East. detachment (26 battalions) to Ufanguansk. pass. For outstanding manhood in previous battles, L. was awarded the Order of St. George of the 4th degree, and on 11 August. granted by the adjutant wing to His Imperial Majesty. Aug 10 L. with his regiment and 4 batteries took the rights. section of the Landasyansky position near the village of Kofintszy, and on August 13. in the morning to the position of the 24th V.-Sib. p. p. began the present part of the 1st brigade of Japan. Guard of General Assad, supported by a strong artillery. by fire, but failed completely. 8 times the Japanese tried to take possession of the trenches, but were recaptured in unison. the efforts of valiant. shooters of the 24th p., acting in notice. connection with artillery under the general. leadership of their courage. com pa When the concentration of our army near Liaoyang began, Lechitsky and the regiment formed one of the vanguards of the III Siberian Corps, which was entrusted with the difficult task of holding the enemy until the crossing through the Vanbatai Pass of all convoys and artillery of the corps ended. With rearguard battles, Lechitsky on August 15 retreated to the forefront of Liaoyang positions and located in the vicinity of the village of Mindyafan, and on August 16 he occupied a site at Tsofantunsky position, which he defended stubbornly in the days of the Liaoyang battle.

During the Chechen attack, Lechitsky became a member of the left column of the III Siberian Corps and from September 25 to 30 participated in the actions of this corps at Bensihu. At the very beginning of the Mukden operation, as soon as the Japanese attack was discovered against the Tsinchechen detachment, the commander-in-chief sent Major General Danilov (23rd and 24th regiments) from the 2nd Army to support the brigade, which occupied the night of February 15, 1905, position on the Tsandansky heights, near the village of Kudyaz. In these positions, until February 23, Lechitsky, together with other parts of General Danilov's detachment, courageously repulsed all the enemy's attacks, until an order was issued to withdraw the 1st Army across the Yellow River.

On May 12, 1905, Lechitsky was promoted to major general for military distinctions, and on August 5 he was appointed commander of the 1st brigade of the 6th East Siberian Infantry Division. On August 15, he was enrolled in His Majesty's Suite; On March 10, 1906, Lechitsky was appointed commander of the 6th East Siberian Rifle Division, and on July 21 - commander of the 1st Guards Infantry Division. It is noteworthy that Platon Alekseevich did not have a higher military education, because did not graduate from the Nikolaev Academy of the General Staff. And the son of a humble priest did not have and could not have any ties in high circles. But this did not in the least prevent him from making a brilliant career in the Russian Imperial Army. On December 12, 1906, he was bestowed upon him the tunic of the 24th East Siberian Rifle Regiment, and on August 26, 1908, he was appointed commander of the XVIII Army Corps. On October 5, 1908, he was promoted to lieutenant general (with seniority of February 14, 1909) and on December 23, 1910, he was appointed commander of the forces of the Amur Military District. Since 1913 - General of Infantry (with seniority of February 14, 1915).

World War I
True glory found the general with the outbreak of the First World War. At the beginning of the war, Lechitsky commanded a group of troops aimed at helping the 4th Army after its failure at Krasnik. On August 9, 1914, he stood at the head of the 9th Army (chief of staff - Lieutenant General A. A. Gulevich), and went through the whole battle campaign with her. Along with the Brusilov 8th Army, it turned out to be the most combat-ready formation of all the Russian armed forces. The very first actions of Lechitsky as commander made him known as a decisive, energetic and proactive commander. During the general offensive of the Southwestern Front, the Ninth Army overturned the opposing enemy, taking September 2, 1914, taking the Polish city of Sandomierz and creating a bridgehead on the San River to attack Krakow. For the Battle of Galicia, General Lechitsky was the first in the Great War to receive one of the highest awards of the Russian Army - the St. George's weapon with diamonds. In total, during the period 1914-1916. only eight people were awarded this award.

The counterattack of the Austro-Germans, which followed that same September, forced the 9th Army to retreat and defend itself on the Vistula line in the vicinity of the Ivangorod fortress. In the battles in front of Ivangorod, Russian troops waited for the defeat of the Germans near Warsaw and on October 13 went on the offensive. On November 2, Lechitsky's army captured the lower reaches of the San, again creating the conditions for an attack on Krakow. For the hardest battles near Ivangorod and the defeat of the Austrian 1st Army, Platon Alekseevich was awarded the 3rd degree Order of St. George the Emperor who visited the headquarters of the Supreme Commander-in-Chief Emperor "for speeding up the army entrusted to him, crossing the Vistula River from Suliev to New Alexandria inclusively, which was broken "stubborn resistance of the enemy and at the same time captured over 200 officers, 15,000 lower ranks, 24 guns and 36 machine guns."

The next stage of the 9th Army's combat route is the Carpathian operation (January — April 1915). Given the shortage of shells, Lechitsky's main task was to organize defense and provide troops with rear supplies. To overcome the positional impasse, his army was entrusted with a complex and responsible operation to circumvent the Austrian defense and attack in Bukovina. During this operation, it was necessary to occupy Budapest, and then make a turn to the north and move to Krakow, knocking the enemy down successively from south to north.
Fighting in the mountains is significantly different from action in the open field. Therefore, Platon Alekseevich issued an order that said: "A frontal attack in the mountains leads to huge losses and still does not give a decisive result, why in all cases rounds should be used and, moreover, sufficient forces." Thanks to this tactic, in the battles of March 16–18 near Khotyn, the 2nd and 3rd cavalry corps defeated the Austro-German army group Marshal, which allowed the 9th army to occupy part of the southern Carpathian passes.

A successful attack was prevented by the German Gorlitsky breakthrough, which forced the Russian Army to retreat. The victorious march of the German army of Mackensen for some time was suspended by the cavalry of the 9th army, commanded by the legendary Count F.A. Keller. The cavalry broke through the defenses of the Austrians and went to the Prut River, taking the cities of Snyatyn, Kolomyia, Chernivtsi.

Nevertheless, the general rollback of the front continued. Against his background, the 9th Army showed great restraint. Having given the Austrians only the Chernivtsi region, she managed to keep her front. Moreover, transferring reinforcements to neighbors, Lechitsky's army tried to hold down the enemy with constant counterattacks in order to prevent him from transferring his troops to other sectors of the front. During the attack of May 19–24, 1915 on the Prut River, the 30th Army Corps of A.M. Zayonchkovsky took 1,5 thousand prisoners. This glorious cause could be successfully developed, but the commander in chief of the armies of the front N.I. Ivanov, contrary to the arguments of Lechitsky, ordered to retreat to the Dniester.

During its 4-month retreat, the 9th Army nevertheless took about 70 thousand prisoners, the award for which became the Order of the White Eagle with swords for Lechitsky. In mid-October, the location of the 9th Army was visited by Emperor Nicholas II, who traveled around the front army, who showed his commander 9.

In early March 1916 Lechitsky fell ill with lobar pneumonia. He was treated by Julius Osipovich Manasevich, the future personal doctor of General Brusilov. Emperor Nicholas II during the next detour of the front visited the sick Lechitsky at the army headquarters in Kamenetz-Podolsk on March 30, 1916.
The name of P. A. Lechitsky thundered throughout the country in the days of Lutsk ("Brusilovsky") breakthrough (May–September 1916). Today, this operation is traditionally associated only with the name of General Brusilov. Sometimes the name of General Kaledin is recalled. Practically nobody remembers the name of Lechitsky, another co-creator of one of the glorious deeds of the Great War.

The 9th Army dealt an auxiliary strike in that operation, which was supposed to distract the enemy from the main direction. Platon Alekseevich was preparing his troops for a breakthrough with all care. He invented a special position - the “field commandant”. He was obliged to constantly monitor battle areas so that not a single extra soul, be it scouts, observing officers, warrant officers and other persons, would be in the enemy's line of sight. Russian balloons and airplanes regularly flew around their positions, carefully recording the slightest changes that could cause the Austrians to think about preparing an attack. In an atmosphere of strict secrecy, they managed to rebuild new bridgeheads at a distance of 100–150 meters from enemy defense lines. In many areas, the Austrians stretched the barbed wire to 70 rows, and in some places started a current on it, but a powerful and accurate artillery strike, coordinated with the infantry commanders to the smallest detail, helped break through the enemy's defenses.

In 19 days, the 9th Army advanced 50 km — more than the neighboring armies. In the battle of Dobronouck she defeated the 7th Austro-Hungarian army. About 38 thousand soldiers, more than 750 officers and 1 general were captured by the Russians, 60 guns and 170 machine guns were captured. The Austrians lost 70 thousand in battle. In addition, Lechitsky forced the German troops to leave, who were in a hurry to support the allies.

On June 18, 1916, the 9th Army took the strongly fortified city of Chernivtsi, the unofficial capital of Bukovina. This was done contrary to the order of Brusilov, who demanded to turn to Galich and Stanislavov as quickly as possible. Lechitsky, however, understood that it was dangerous to leave an unfinished group and base in a large city on the left flank. Only after ending it, he moved his troops to Stanislavov and on August 11 took him.

The award to the legendary commander for his active participation in the Brusilovsky breakthrough was the Order of St. Alexander Nevsky with swords. In the same 1916, Emperor Nicholas II, on the proposal of the Protopresbyter of the military and naval clergy George Shchavelsky, awarded the priest Alexy Lechitsky (father of the general) the Order of St. Vladimir of the 4th degree “in retribution of the merits of his son”, and Archbishop Konstantin (Bulychev) of Mogilev and Mstislavsky with blessing The Holy Synod elevated him to the rank of archpriest.

In the fall of 1916, the center of gravity of the Southwestern Front moved south due to the fact that Romania entered the war on the side of Russia. True, the allies immediately proved to be a heavy burden for the Russian army - they were practically unworkable and immediately began to suffer heavy defeats from the Austro-Hungarian.

In this situation, P. A. Lechitsky held a front stretched for 320 kilometers for two months, reflecting the violent attacks of two enemy armies. The heroism of his troops delayed the fall of Bucharest for a month! In the end, on November 24, 1916, a new front was created on this site - the Romanian, which included the 9th Army. Lechitsky did not become the commander-in-chief of this front for the sole reason - he did not speak the French language in which he was to communicate with the Romanian allies.

Fate after the revolution

After the February Revolution, without reconciling with the new order, he left the command of the army. He was promoted to the post of Assistant Commander-in-Chief of the Romanian Front instead of the resigned General Sakharov. Since April 18, 1917, at the disposal of the Minister of War. On May 7, 1917, retired. He resigned from the post of commander in chief of the armies of the Western Front.

December 3, 1919, was arrested for speculating in food, but the next day was released. Since 1920 in the Red Army. Since January 1921, the inspector of infantry and cavalry of the Petrograd Military District. In 1921 he was arrested, kept in the Taganskaya prison in Moscow, where he died of exhaustion on February 18, 1923.

According to other sources, he was arrested a second time on March 8, 1920, as the head of a counter-revolutionary military organization. Sentenced to 2 years in prison. He died on February 2, 1921, in the 1st Moscow prison hospital.

Opinions and ratings
Marshal A.M. Vasilevsky in memoirs:

    The 9th Army was commanded by General P. A. Lechitsky, the only army commander at that time who did not leave the officers of the General Staff, that is, did not receive a higher military education. But then it was a military general: in the Russo-Japanese war he commanded a regiment and was known in the army as an energetic military leader ...

    General Lechitsky was often in the army, and more than once I had to see him in different front-line situations. Unspoken, but rather agile, to me, a young officer, he seemed, however, somewhat decrepit.
    - MILITARY LITERATURE. Memoirs. Vasilevsky A.M. Life's work

From the memoirs of the former Minister of War of the Provisional Government and subsequently of the Soviet military leader A.I. Verkhovsky:

    ... A small, dry old man, all white, with a large white mustache, with a stubborn gaze of narrow, incredulously looking eyes, this general was distinguished by great honesty, military instinct, and caution. Moreover, in his own way he loved soldiers, studied and knew their positive and negative traits. All his activities were subject to the rule: measure seven times and only then cut off. And I must say that in the conditions in which the troops were located, with the clearly expressed reluctance of soldiers to fight, this was the only possible line.

    Lechitsky advanced during the Russo-Japanese War precisely with these qualities. He watched with great attention both the mood of the fighters and that they were full, dressed and shod. “A soldier without soles is not a soldier,” Lechitsky liked to say, and he never required efforts from his units that were beyond their capabilities.

    There were few good commanders during the Russo-Japanese war. Lechitsky was noticed and appointed first as regiment commander, then division commander. If there was no war, he, having commanded a battalion, should have, like most army infantrymen, resigned. Regiments in the tsarist army were given to the guardsmen and officers of the General Staff, and only as an exception to ordinary army officers. But the war helped to reveal his non-shouting, but genuine military talent. What harmed him was a stern look from browed brows. It was not easy for them to discern in this little man a big, honest and full of love for people heart.
    - [MILITARY LITERATURE. Memoirs. Verkhovsky A.I. On the hard pass]

Publication in the newspaper "New time" from March 25 (12), 1917:

    The old honored warrior soldier General Lechitsky was appointed commander in chief instead of Evert. Lechitsky knows the whole Russian army. He earned himself a fighting name back in the Japanese company, and during the days of this war he was the main participant in our attack on Galicia and the Carpathians, recaptured the Austrians from Lublin, invaded the enemy's borders, crossed Bukovina, and recently sat in the Forest Carpathians. Fate has more than once pushed me against General Lechitsky, I had to talk to him, observe him in a combat situation and was always struck by the unusual simplicity, directness and firmness of this man. The son of a village priest, who achieved everything without any patronage solely by his talents, General Lechitsky never turned a blind eye to our military shortcomings, but firmly believed in a Russian soldier and in the fate of Russia. In the days when they talk about the democratization of the army, about the public rights of soldiers, when undeserved accusations are thrown to officers who are no different from soldiers in the war, it would be hard to find a better commander in chief. Strong will, determination, the ability to grasp the circumstances and conform to the situation, the understanding of the soldier - these are the qualities that distinguish the new commander in chief. Commander-in-Chief Lechitsky is not so much a general as a soldier-soldier.

    AIK
    - [AND. IK. The new commander in chief gene. Lechitsky. New time from March 25 (12), 1917]

Awards
Order of Saint Stanislaus (House of Romanov), 3rd degree. (1887)
Order of St. Anne of the 3rd degree (1893)
Order of Saint Stanislaus (House of Romanov), 2nd degree. (09/11/1895)
Order of St. Anne of the 2nd degree (05/01/1900)
swords for the Order of Saint Stanislaus (House of Romanov), 2nd degree. (1901)
Order of St. Vladimir of the 4th degree with swords and bow (11.11.1903 - for the difference in cases against the Chinese)
Golden Weapon for Bravery (12/9/1904 - for the difference in cases against the Japanese)
Order of St. George 4th degree (02/13/1905)
Order of St. Vladimir 3rd degree with swords (04/04/1905 - for the difference in cases against the Japanese)
Order of Saint Stanislaus (House of Romanov), 1st degree with swords (08/15/1907 - for military distinctions)
Order of St. Anne 1st Class (1911)
Order of St. Vladimir, 2nd degree (1913)
St. George's weapons with diamonds (09/29/1914 - for battles from August 21 to September 10, 1914)
Order of St. George 3rd degree (10/22/1914 - for forcing the crossing of the Vistula River from Suliev to Novaya Aleksandr, entrusted to him by the army entrusted to him, which broke the stubborn resistance of the enemy and captured over 200 officers, 15,000 lower ranks, 24 guns and 38 machine guns). He was granted a visit by the Head of the Supreme Commander Emperor.
Order of the White Eagle with swords (10/13/1915)
Order of St. Alexander Nevsky with swords (07/06/1916)

Foreign orders
Chinese Order of the Double Dragon, 3rd century 1st grade
Grand Cross of the Order of the Crown of Romania
large cross of the Order of the Star of Romania with swords (1917)

Medals
Silver medal "For a trip to China" on the St. Andrew-Vladimir ribbon.
Light-bronze medal "In memory of the Japanese war of 1904-1905" on the Alexander-George ribbon with a bow.
Red Cross Medal "In Memory of the Russo-Japanese War" on the Alexander Ribbon.

Literature
A.I. K. The new commander of the gene. Lechitsky. // New time from March 25 (12), 1917.
Avilov R. S. Military reforms in the Amur Military District on the eve of the First World War (1910 — summer 1914) // Russian collection. Research on the history of Russia. Vol. 19. M.: Modest Kolerov, 2016.S. 416-477. 
Avilov R.S. The Amur Military District during the First World War: troops and defensive tasks. // Looking into the past. World wars of the 20th century in the history of the Russian Far East. Vladivostok: FEB RAS, 2015.S. 5-41.  [1]
Avilov R. S., Ayushin N. B., Kalinin V. I. Vladivostok fortress: troops, fortification, events, people. Part III. "The fortress of three dimensions." Vladivostok: Dalnauka, 2016 .-- 518 p. - (Volume: 65 l.p.) 
Bazanov S. N. Non-shouting, but genuine military talent. // Military History Journal. 2016. No. 11. S. 54-58. 
Bondarenko V.V. Forgotten Heroes of the Great War. // Belarusian thought. 2013. No. 7. P.33-35.
Verkhovsky A. I. On a difficult pass. - M .: Military Publishing, 1959. - 448 p. (Military memoirs) / Notes by S. S. Khesin.
Lechitsky, Platon Alekseevich // Military Encyclopedia: [in 18 vol.] / Ed. V.F. Novitsky ... [and others]. - SPb. ; [M.]: Type. t-va I. D. Sytin, 1911-1915.
Zalessky K. A. Who was who in the First World War. - M .: AST; Astrel, 2003 .-- 896 p. - 5,000 copies. -  (ACT);  (Astrel).
Oskin M.V. General Lechitsky - commander of the First World War. // Military History Journal. 2017. No. 1. S. 53-59. 
Fedorova E. Forgotten heroes of the Great War: Plato Lechitsky.

References

External links
 

1856 births
1923 deaths
Russian military personnel of the Boxer Rebellion
Russian military personnel of the Russo-Japanese War
Russian military personnel of World War I
Recipients of the Gold Sword for Bravery
Recipients of the Order of Saint Stanislaus (Russian), 2nd class